Eyn-e Sheykh (also Romanized as ‘Eyn-e Sheykh; also known as Ainashaikh, Aynasheykh, and ‘Eyn Sheykh) is a village in Deylaman Rural District, Deylaman District, Siahkal County, Gilan Province, Iran. At the 2006 census, its population was 315, in 103 families.

References 

Populated places in Siahkal County